Kiprusoff is a surname. Notable people with the surname include:

Marko Kiprusoff (born 1972), Finnish ice hockey player
Miikka Kiprusoff (born 1976), Finnish ice hockey player, brother of Marko

Finnish-language surnames